Darli Arni Pacheco Montañez (born April 16, 1989, in Puerto Rico), also known as Darla Pacheco, is a Puerto Rican beauty pageant titleholder and a model.

Beauty pageants

Miss Puerto Rico Universe 2009
On October 22, 2008, Pacheco competed at the Miss Puerto Rico Universe 2009 pageant representing the state of Ponce. Darli became one of the twenty semi-finalists.

Miss International Beauty 2009
On August 1, 2009, Pacheco competed at the Miss International Beauty 2009 pageant representing her country Puerto Rico.

Miss Universe Puerto Rico 2012
On November 7, 2011, Pacheco competed at the Miss Universe Puerto Rico 2012 pageant representing the city of Yabucoa. She finished in the Top 10 and won the Best Legs Award.

Miss Earth Puerto Rico 2012
On August 11, 2012, Pacheco competed at the Miss Earth Puerto Rico 2012 pageant, where she was crowned as the Miss Earth Puerto Rico 2012. Darli represented Puerto Rico at the Miss Earth 2012 pageant in Indonesia but failed to place in the semifinals.

Miss Mundo de Puerto Rico 2014
Pacheco represented Ponce at Miss Mundo de Puerto Rico 2014 where she finished in the Top 6. The eventual winner was Genesis Davila of Arroyo.

References

1989 births
Living people
Miss Puerto Rico winners
Puerto Rican female models
Miss Earth 2012 contestants